Albert Miralles (born 14 May 1982) is a Spanish retired professional basketball player.

Professional career

NBA Draft
Miralles was drafted by the Toronto Raptors in the 2004 NBA Draft. The Miami Heat acquired his rights from the Toronto Raptors in exchange for the draft rights of Pape Sow (47th pick in the 2005 draft) and the Heat's 2005 second round pick.

In 2005, Miralles was acquired by the Boston Celtics in the Antoine Walker trade. Since then, he was traded to the Milwaukee Bucks for Keyon Dooling and a second-round pick.

On 7 July 2016 the Cleveland Cavaliers acquired Miralles' rights in exchange for Matthew Dellavedova and cash considerations. Later, the Cavaliers traded his rights to the Chicago Bulls in exchange for Mike Dunleavy Jr. and the rights to Vladimir Veremeenko.

Club career
Miralles has played professionally in Spain for Pamesa Valencia (2005–09) and Lagun Aro GBC (2009–11); in Italy for Virtus Bologna (2002), Basket Rimini Crabs (2002–03), Euro Roseto (2003–04), Vertical Vision Cantu (2004–05) and Angelico Biella (2011–12).

On 31 August 2012 Miralles signed with the German Euroleague club Alba Berlin. One year later, he signed a two-year deal with his origin club, Joventut Badalona. In July 2015, he re-signed with Joventut for two more years.

Spain national basketball team
He won silver medal with the U-20 Spanish national team in the 2002 FIBA Europe Under-20 Championship. Miralles has played five games with the Spanish team.

References

External links
 ACB.com profile
 FIBA.com profile
 Euroleague.net profile

1982 births
Living people
Alba Berlin players
Basket Rimini Crabs players
Basketball players from Catalonia
CB Inca players
Centers (basketball)
Club Ourense Baloncesto players
Gipuzkoa Basket players
Joventut Badalona players
Liga ACB players
Pallacanestro Biella players
Pallacanestro Cantù players
Spanish expatriate basketball people in Italy
Spanish expatriate sportspeople in Germany
Spanish men's basketball players
Toronto Raptors draft picks
Valencia Basket players
Virtus Bologna players